Sir Robert de Herle was an English military commander who was Admiral of all the Fleets about England and Lord Warden of the Cinque Ports during the mid-14th century.

Personal

He was the son of William de Herle (Chief Justice of the Court of Common Pleas intermittently between 1327–37 and one of the king's council until his death in 1364).

Early career

Robert de Herle became an important official in the earl of Warwick's administration of the West Midlands, becoming his most senior official for at least the decade beginning after 1339.

Robert was overlord at the Leicestershire village of Kirby Muxloe, but more significantly became one of Thomas, the earl of Warwick's most prominent retainers and was granted a life indenture at Wadborough.

During the 1340–50s all legal settlements in Warwickshire were subject to the goodwill of Thomas, earl of Warwick, who has been called 'the most powerful lay figure in the West Midlands', at the time. The earl's absolute control over Warwickshire's administration caused a large number of people to depart the county, not 'willing to be judged by' the earl, or his officials, chief amongst, them being de Herle. In February 1345, de Herle was required by the king, along with others in the administration 'to provide a list of those who were refusing to be judged by him'.

Shortly thereafter, in the July 1345 he was in the group Warwick had entrusted some of his lands to, as marriage settlements for his daughters. In 1355 and 1357 Sir Robert Herle fought in the Scottish Campaign where he received substantial rewards for the return of a number of prisoners.

Herle was one of the ‘bachelors’ of Warwick's household during times of peace, and was required to attend the earl at tournaments and in the event of war.

Warwick granted Herle the wardenship of Barnard Castle along with its forests and lands, this, it has been stated made Herle a pivotal figure in the running of the earl's estates. Herle's was further granted a lifetime lease on several lands and rents in the vicinity of the Castle.

"In September 1343, Herle obtained a pardon of the king's suit for homicides, felonies, robberies and larcenies perpetrated by him and any consequent outlawries, and it is noted that the pardon was sealed personally in front of Edward III and Thomas, earl of Warwick."

Robert Herle was associated with the Bassett family of Drayton in 1339 as retainer to the Bassett manors of Moulton, Buckby, Olney and Walsall.

Constable of Dover Castle and Lord Warden of the Cinque Ports

Until now all lists state that the Lord Warden of the Cinque Ports for the year 1361 was Sir Richard de Herle, this was however not the case and in fact the appointment was granted to Sir Robert Herle. No evidence has been found in this short study for the existence of a Richard, and I conclude this to be an age old error now rectified.

"By November of 1360 he is described as the ‘king's lieutenant in Brittany’, whilst a year later he was referred to as the ‘king's admiral’, and was Constable of Dover Castle and Lord Warden of the Cinque ports." (see ref. below).

In addition from November 1354, Robert Herle acted for the king as the steward of the lands and castles of the king's sons, Edmund and John.

In addition to his long service to the earl of Warwick, during the later years of the 1340s Herle also became an important agent of the Crown and an officer of the king's household. He continued his service for, and close association with the earl of Warwick, who was instrumental in Herle's career, and is found named on a number of Warwick's most important charters between 1350–60.

Senior naval command
He was appointed Commander-in-Chief of the English Navy from 2 December 1360 - 7 July 1364 with the title of Admiral of the Kings Southern, Northern and Western Fleets.

References

Footnotes

Sources
 Nicolas, Sir Nicholas Harris (1847). A History of the Royal Navy: 1327–1422. London, England: R. Bentley.
 Rodger, N.A.M. (2004). The safeguard of the sea : a naval history of Britain 660 to 1649. New York: W.W. Norton.

External links
Barfield and the Beauchamp family.

English admirals
Herle, Robert de
14th-century English Navy personnel
1316 births
1364 deaths